The Unmasking is a 1914 American silent short film starring William Garwood, Harry De Vere, Jack Richardson Vivian Rich and Louise Lester, Charlotte Burton, and Harry Van Meter.

Cast
 William Garwood as Harold Clark
 Harry Van Meter as John Dayton 
 Harry De Vere as Judge Morrow
 Jack Richardson as William Thornby
 Vivian Rich as Clare Morrow
 Louise Lester as Clare's mother
 Charlotte Burton as Adele Hamilton

External links
 

1914 films
1914 drama films
Silent American drama films
American silent short films
American black-and-white films
1914 short films
1910s American films